Lavaur is the name of several communes in France:

 Lavaur, Dordogne, in the Dordogne département
 Lavaur, Tarn, in the Tarn département